The Scout is a 1989 film by the Iranian director Ebrahim Hatamikia. Hatamikia also scripted the film, which starred Gholamreza Ali Akbari and Mehrdad Solaymani. Set during the Iran-Iraq war, it is an example of Sacred Defense cinema.

Plot

Cast

References

External links 
 

1989 films
Films directed by Ebrahim Hatamikia
Iran–Iraq War films
Iranian war drama films
1990s war drama films